Dick's Kitchen was a "paleo-friendly" restaurant with multiple locations in Portland, Oregon.

Description 
The high-vegetable, low-grain menu offered gluten-free, paleo, and vegan options, including burgers, sandwiches, sausages, and desserts. The interior of the southeast Portland restaurant was decorated with portraits of notable men named Richard, including Dick Van Dyke, Richard Burton, and Richard Nixon. Drinks at the northwest Portland location included the Dick's-A-Rita and Dick's Elixir.

History 
Richard Satnick opened the first restaurant on Southeast Belmont in the Sunnyside neighborhood in August 2010. He opened a second restaurant in northwest Portland in late 2011, in a space which previously housed Lucy's Table. Meat was sourced from Carmen Ranch in Wallowa, Oregon, as of 2014. The "sister-restaurant" Dick's Primal Burger opened in southeast Portland's Woodstock neighborhood in 2015, offering counter service.

The Dick's Kitchen in Sunnyside closed and was replaced by Taqueria Los Puñales. The outpost in northwest Portland closed and the space was later occupied by the Indian restaurant Bhuna.

Reception
In 2016 and 2017, Dick's won in the Best Paleo Options category in Willamette Week annual readers' poll. The restaurant won second place in the same category in 2020.

See also
 List of defunct restaurants of the United States

References

External links

 Dick's Kitchen (Nob Hill/Uptown) at Zomato
 Dick's Kitchen (Sunnyside) at Zomato

2010 establishments in Oregon
Defunct restaurants in Portland, Oregon
Northwest District, Portland, Oregon
Restaurants established in 2010
Sunnyside, Portland, Oregon